El Crack is a 1981 Spanish film drama co-written and directed by José Luis Garci, starring Alfredo Landa. José Luis Garci won the Oscar to Best Foreign picture the next year with his next film "Volver a Empezar" ("Begin The Beguine"), the first Oscar won by Spanish cinema. The plot was inspired by the novels written by Dashiell Hammett, to whom the film is dedicated. It is a detective film and basically a Spanish film noir. The whole story takes place in Madrid and New York City in December 1980.

Plot 

Germán Areta (nicknamed "El Piojo") is a 43-year-old private detective in Madrid. He previously spent 12 years as a Police Detective and now has his own Private Eye agency solving mostly "routine" cases like marital infidelities, working absences, minor celebrity-related information and other matters. Along with him works his employee and "jack-of-all-trades" Cárdenas, (nicknamed "El Moro"), a chatty and funny man and former car thief, once arrested and after that freed by Germán while he was in the Police. Moro is German's main connection with the underworld and night life.

One day, Francisco Medina, a widower and mysterious man, comes to German's office and asks him to find his daughter, Isabel, who was 17 years old when she ran away two years ago. The only reference he can provide is a former boyfriend she had, Nico, who now works as a radio DJ. Germán comes in contact with him and learns that she became pregnant of him; Nico says he told her that it was fine for him and they could have the baby, but her father opposed and forced her to have an abortion in a London clinic. Just after she recovered from the abortion she run away from home and Nico lost her trail, until half a year later he got word she was in Madrid working in Las Gatitas, a high-end nightclub, as an escort (a barely-legal cover for prostitution).

Indirectly it is shown that, in the best cinema-noir line, Germán is a cold-blooded, hard-boiled man, disenchanted of a lonely life and tired of his dirty work and the violent underworld surrounding it, but nevertheless in his spare time, Germán has a blossoming relationship with Carmen, a nurse he met when he was in hospital some time ago. Carmen has a four-year-old daughter, Maite, born from a former relation with a married doctor. Carmen has  not overcome completely the end of that relation, but reveals to Germán she likes being with him, but she still needs some time and patience from him. The detective is so fond of the little girl Maite, he often takes her to or from school and plays with her, and evidently his only moments of real happiness are while being with Carmen and Maite.

El Moro confirms the nightclub lead was correct, but Isabel Medina is not there anymore. He learns that she left and enrolled in a private VIP escort pool whose head is Mimí de Torres, the "Madame" of a luxury brothel in the dark but a lady with an impeccable social face up front, and wealthy and powerful customers who have become friends. Germán proceeds to visit Mimí de Torres, but after Germán explains to her the story of Isabel's disappearance and his knowledge of her working for Mimí for some time, Mimí denies everything and dismisses Germán from her house after a brief argument. Not long after, Germán starts receiving pressure from various channels to stop investigating the case of Isabel Medina's disappearance. His former police superior, with whom he still deals now and then as part of his detective job, informally meets him and tells him that "someone from a high spot" is taking an interest in his investigation, and suggests him to stop it at once since Mimí de Torres has powerful friends in politics, financial areas, etc.

Then his former police colleague Alberto "El Guapo", an impeccably-dressed young man now also working free-lance in the Security private sector for some wealthy clients, meets him and after discussing German's confrontation with Mimí de Torres, offers him to join his security group with an excellent wage, with the unspoken condition that he stops the Medina investigation immediately. Germán refuses his offer at once, but wonders what will come next, now that he has turned down the "carrot" offered to him.

When Germán contacts Francisco Medina to speak with him again, he founds out that he is in an hospital ICU, with a terminal illness he had not revealed to Germán. He is aware he has a short time to live and what he wanted is to see his daughter before dying. Nevertheless, Germán speaks hardly to him for not telling him the whole truth about Isabel.

The day after, Cárdenas tells Germán that he has found a good lead from a friend working in bank computer databases. His friend found that Isabel Medina withdraws money from a certain bank office exactly the 17th of each month, which happens to be the next day. Germán and Cárdenas wait the next day in the bank until Isabel shows up; Germán talks to her and says her father is willing to see her and he might not have much time left due to his illness. She says that for her her father died time ago and is not interested in seeing him anymore. Germán now has the sad duty to inform Isabel's father (who is in an almost terminal state by now) that she does not want to see him anyway; after Germán leaves the room he commits suicide by disconnecting his vital support machines.

Although badly, the case seems over for Germán, until while going to the movies with Carmen the next evening he stops looking at a film publicity still in the hall of the Cine Capitol, one of Madrid's most famous cinemas. It is a reversed copy of the film's main poster, left being right. Suddenly, he realizes the photo from Isabel Madina he had from her father is mirrored too, and that she is left-handed. Consequently, he realizes the woman he met in the bank was not Isabel since she was clearly right-handed, and it was a set-up.

Someone of high finance areas are involved in the girl's missing case, and as a warning to the detective, a bomb in his car kills Maite. This leaves Areta heartbroken, but more determine than ever to find the truth of what ever happened to Isabel. Some time later, Germán breaks into Alberto's house and knocks him unconscious. When he wakes up, he is obliged to confess everything he knows about Medina's case as Germán strapped a bomb to his stomach with bandages when he was passed-out. Alberto reveals that the girl died two years ago at the hands of Ziener, an important entrepreneur and financier he works for. Afterwards, Alberto threw the body inside the formwork of an under-construction bridge at the time.

Areta travels to New York City in pursue of the responsible for the deaths of Maite and Isabel with the forced collaboration of Alberto. Germán finally kills Ziener in the restroom of an Italian restaurant. In the airport before returning home, Germán calls Alberto, who is waiting in his hotel room as they had planned before, to tell him that he doesn't really have a bomb attached to his body. Furious about the assumed deception, Alberto removes the bandages and the bomb explodes, killing him instantly. Back in Madrid, Germán rekindles his relationship with Carmen.

Cast 
 Alfredo Landa - Germán Areta "El Piojo"
 María Casanova - Carmen
 Manuel Tejada - Don Alberto "El Guapo"
 Miguel Rellán - Cárdenas "El Moro"
 Manuel Lorenzo - Rocky
 Raúl Fraire - Francisco Medina
 José Bódalo - Don Ricardo "El Abuelo"
 Mónica Emilió Prieto - Maite
 Mayrata O'Wisiedo - Mimí de Torres
 Francisco Vidal - Nico
 José Manuel Cervino - Vareta

References

External links
 

1981 films
1980s Spanish-language films
Films with screenplays by José Luis Garci
Films directed by José Luis Garci
Spanish crime drama films
Films shot in Madrid
Films shot in New York City
Films set in Madrid
Films set in New York City